Wang Maozu (4 March 1891 - 9 January 1949) was a Chinese educationist and philosopher. In the 1920s, he earned his master's degree at the Teachers College, Columbia University under the instruction of John Dewey, then became a researcher at Harvard University. Several years later, he returned to China and taught at Beijing Normal University, Beijing Women's Normal College and National Central University.

In 1927, he resigned from National Central University and established Suzhou High School, based on Jiangsu Provincial No.1 Normal School. During the Anti-Japanese War, he was a professor at the National Southwestern Associated University.

References

1891 births
1949 deaths
Educators from Suzhou
Teachers College, Columbia University alumni
Harvard University faculty
Academic staff of Beijing Normal University
Academic staff of the National Central University
Philosophers from Jiangsu
Republic of China philosophers
Academic staff of the National Southwestern Associated University